Ne Win (sometimes spelled Nay Win) is a Burmese name, and may refer to:

 Ne Win (1911-2002): Burmese general, politician and dictator of Burma (1962-1988)
 Kawleikgyin Ne Win (1928-1983): Two-time Myanmar Academy Award winning actor
 Hayma Ne Win: Singer, daughter of Kawleikgyin Ne Win
 Yaza Ne Win: Actor, son of Kawleikgyin Ne Win
 Newin Chidchob: Buriram United F.C. chairman

See also
Nevin (disambiguation)